12 warm-up matches were played between 13 and 19 September featuring all 12 teams.

Fixtures

References 

2012 ICC World Twenty20